The 1897 Oregon Webfoots football team represented the University of Oregon in the 1897 college football season. It was the Webfoots' fourth season; they competed as an independent and were led by head coach Joe Smith. They finished the season with a record of one win and one loss (1–1).

Schedule

References

Oregon
Oregon Ducks football seasons
Oregon Webfoots football